= Circurious =

Circurious is a cast of jugglers, singers, contortionists, singers, and dancers, which perform in various places in the United States, started in August 2008. They have been featured on several television shows such as Good Morning America, David Letterman, MTV, ESPN, and the New Year's Eve Party in Times Square. The acts include aerialists and acrobats, athletic performers, contortionists and other acts like singing and dancing.
